Symphony Live in Istanbul is an album by Japanese new-age recording artist Kitaro, released by Domo Records on September 9, 2014. The album was recorded live at the Halic Congress Center in Istanbul, Turkey over two evenings in March 2014.

Commenting on the event, Kitaro said, "This past spring, I embarked upon my first Symphonic Tour that reached Russia, Eastern and Central Europe and had the distinct pleasure of performing in Istanbul; a place where from ancient times to modern times, has flourished as an important hub of the Silk Road where Europe and Asia meet. I am extremely grateful that my dream of performing in Istanbul finally came true."

In December 2014, Kitaro was honored by The National Academy of Recording Arts & Sciences for his work on Symphony Live in Istanbul, recognized as Best New Age Album, becoming Kitaro's 16th career Grammy Award nomination.

Track listing

Awards

Personnel
Kitaro – Producer, Composer, Arranger, Keyboards, Peace Bell, Cover Art Painting
Stephen Small – Arranger, Conductor, Keyboards, Music Director
Michael Wilson – Recording & Mixing, Production Manager
Tim Gennert – Mastering
Keiko Takahashi – Keyboards, Photography
Jessica Hindin – Violin
Dan Antunovich – Bass
Jasper De Roos – Drums
The Alexander Symphony Orchestra
Philip Gerke – Stage Tech
Elijah Topazio – Monitor Engineer
Leslie Weinberg – Lighting Designer
Andrew Gearhart – Keyboard Tech

Additional Personnel
Eiichi Naito – Executive Producer, Management, Photography
Dino Malito – Artists & Repertoire, Management
Howard Sapper – Business & Legal
Kio Griffith – Art Direction, Design
Atsuko Mizuta – Marketing & Promotions
Mai Okuno – Marketing & Promotions

References

External links
Kitaro official site
Kitaro Official Facebook
 Symphony Live In Istanbul Playlist on YouTube

2014 albums
Kitarō albums
New-age albums